Tommy Taylor (born May 8, 1957) is an American musician, vocalist and songwriter, who is best known for being a touring and recording member with Christopher Cross and Eric Johnson.

Early years
Developing an infatuation with many types of music at a very early age, he quickly expanded his interests, exploring the playing of various musical instruments and singing. He acquired his first guitar at the age of eight in December 1965, discovering by chance, that he was also potentially quite adept at playing the drums, drumming became his primary objective.

By age eleven he was working professionally as a drummer, and by age thirteen, he was headlining the most prominent night spots in Austin, TX.

Christopher Cross
In 1977, Taylor landed the drummer/vocalist slot with the burgeoning original music group, Christopher Cross. His performances on Cross's classic debut LP, "Christopher Cross," helped garner 5 Grammy Awards in 1981, Including Album of The Year, along with a 5× Platinum Certification. Taylor also featured on two tracks on Cross' second album, Another Page. When touring the world, Christopher Cross opened for Bonnie Raitt, Fleetwood Mac, The Eagles, Foreigner, Cheap Trick, and America, as well as headlining their own concert dates.

Eric Johnson
In 1984, Taylor began what would become a lifetime partnership with fellow Austin musician Eric Johnson. In 1988, Taylor played with Eric Johnson on the TV show, Austin City Limits, it has since become the most requested episode in 40-year history of the show, and subsequently became a CD/DVD release, along with Gold Certification. Taylor has been featured on almost every single album of Johnson's as either a drummer, percussionist, vocalist, writer, or arranger. Taylor is featured on the Grammy Award-winning smash hit, "Cliffs of Dover" from the Platinum album Ah Via Musicom among many of the studio performances over the years.

Present Day and Solo Album
In 2018–2019, Taylor played a sold-out tour with Eric Johnson and Kyle Brock, re-playing the Ah Via Musicom album from cover to cover, along with new cuts from Johnson's record Collage. The tour featured a headline spot at 2019's Crossroads Guitar Festival, returning to the festival after 15 years.

In 2020, Taylor was due to release a solo LP titled, What To Say of The Gold. It is co-produced by Mark Hallman, and features Michael Omartian, Roscoe Beck, David Lee Holt, and Mark Andes among others.

On October 15, 2022, Taylor released his debut single, "Summit," from his upcoming solo album.

Discography

Solo
What To Say of The Gold (TBA)

Appearances with Eric Johnson
 Tones (1986)
 Ah Via Musicom (1990)
 Venus Isle (1996)
 Souvenir (2002)
 Bloom (2005)
 Live from Austin, TX (Eric Johnson album) (2006)
 Up Close (Eric Johnson album) (2010)
 EJ (2016)
 Collage (2017)
 EJ Vol. 2 (2019)
 The Book of Making (2022)
 Yesterday Meets Today (2022)

Appearances with Christopher Cross
Christopher Cross (1980)
Another Page (1983)

Various appearances and guest work
Alessi - Long Time Friends (1982)
Lisa Rhodes - Shivers (1985)
The Sweaters (1985)
Eliza Gilkyson - Legend of Rainmaker (1987)
Various – Guitar Speak (1988) - track "Western Flyer"
Will and the Kill - Will and the Kill (1988)
Tommy Elskes - King of Dixie (1992)
Sara Hickman - Necessary Angels (1994)
Barry Richman - The Moment Of Now (1994)
Will Sexton - Keep To Myself Sound Service (1994)
Hamilton Pool - Return To Zero (1995)
Kris McKay - Things that Show (1996)
Barry Richman - Temporary Eternity (1997)
Chris Holzhaus - Welcome to Bluzhill (1998)
Jake Andrews - Time to Burn (1999)
Newmatics - Up Popped Pancho (2000)
Elizabeth Rice - The Wishing Tree (2001)
Double Trouble - Been A Long Time (2001)
Mandy Mercier - Wild Dreams of The Shy Boys (2001)
Kay Kay and The Rays - Big Bad Girl (2003)
Sarah Hamman - Breath by Breath (2003)
David Lee Holt - Perpetual Motion (2004)
Lorrie Singer & Bradley Kopp - Walk Tall (2005)
Brandon McHose - Life Eclipse (2007)
Mandy Mercier - Run Out of Darkness (2007)
Carson Brock - Signs (2010)
Mandy Mercier - Singer In A Roadhouse Band (2010)
All ATX - All ATX (2013)
All ATX - British Invasion (2014)
All ATX - Austin Goes Psychedelic (2015)Friends of Sims (2015)
Van Wilks - 21st Century Blues (2015)
Ina Forsman - Ina Forsman (2016)
Ross William Perry - Open (2016)
Texas Horns - Get Here Quick (2019)
Whitney Shay - Stand Up (2020)
 Gabe Stillman - Just Say The Word (2021)
Texas Horns - Everybody Lets Roll'' (2022)

References

1957 births
Living people
American guitarists
Musicians from Texas